Microcotyle erythrini is a species of monogenean, parasitic on the gills of a marine fish. It belongs to the family Microcotylidae. This species was described by Van Beneden & Hesse in 1863 and redescribed by Parona & Perugia in 1890.

Hosts and localities

The type-host is  Pagellus erythrinus. The type-locality is off Brest. The species has been since recorded from three other hosts (Pagellus acarne, Boops boops  and Dentex dentex in several localities in the Mediterranean (Montenegro, France, Italy, Algeria, Spain, Turkey) and in the Atlantic, off France and off Spain).

References

Microcotylidae
Parasites of fish
Animals described in 1863